The Hinuq language (autonym: гьинузас мец hinuzas mec, also known as Hinukh, Hinux, Ginukh, or Ginux) is a Northeast Caucasian language of the Tsezic subgroup. It is spoken by about 200 to 500 people, the Hinukhs, in the Tsuntinsky District of southwestern Dagestan, mainly in the village of Genukh (Hinukh: Hino). Hinukh is very closely related to Tsez, but they are not entirely mutually intelligible.

Only half of the children of the village speak the Hinukh language. As Hinukh is unwritten, Avar and Russian are used as literary languages. Hinukh is not considered to have dialects, but due to its linguistic proximity to Tsez, it was once considered a Tsez dialect.

The Hinukh people were already mentioned in the Georgian chronicles of the Early Middle Ages. The language itself was first described in 1916 by Russian ethnographer A. Serzhputovsky.

Phonology

Vowels
Hinukh distinguishes 6 vowel qualities , all of which can be either long or short. However, these are only used by the older generation.

Consonants
Like many Caucasian languages, Hinuq has a large number of consonants. In addition to voiced and unvoiced consonants, there are also ejectives.

Morphology
It is an agglutinative language which makes mainly use of suffixes.

Nouns
Hinukh is an ergative-absolutive language and, like most Northeast Caucasian languages, shows a rich case system. There are six non-spatial cases (Absolutive, Ergative, First Genitive, Second Genitive, Dative, Instrumental) as well as 35 spatial cases. The spatial case system itself consists of two categories, location  and orientation, expressed by the use of direction markers (Essive, Lative, First Ablative, Second Ablative, Directional). The plural suffix is almost invariably -be.

Hinuq distinguishes a direct and oblique stem. Case suffixes are primarily added to the oblique stem. To form the oblique stem, there are different options, including oblique suffixes, epenthetic vowels, deletion of the base-stem-final consonant, vowel, or semivowel; stress shift or ablaut. The oblique stem suffixes are -mo, -a, -la, -i, -ya, -o, -li, -yi, -ra, -ro, -ru, -do, -u, -na, -nu. Some examples of nominal declension are given below.

There are five genders in Hinuq which play an important role in the language's grammar.

Verbs
Tenses are marked synthetically on the verbs by means of affixes. As its sister languages Bezhta and Tsez, Hinukh differentiates between "witnessed past" (ending in -s or -š) and "unwitnessed past" (in -no); the present tense is marked with the suffix -ho. In the future tense, Hinukh distinguishes a "direct future" (-n), which is used only in the first person and an "indirect future" (-s) used for all other persons.

Numerals
The numeral system is vigesimal, which means that it is a base-20 system, a feature commonly found among the languages of the Caucasus.

References

 Forker, Diana. A Grammar of Hinuq. Mouton Grammar Library [MGL] 63. DE GRUYTER Mouton, 2013. - 827 pages.

External links
The Peoples of the Red Book: THE HINUKHS
 Hinuq basic lexicon at the Global Lexicostatistical Database
 Rosetta Project: Hinukh Swadesh List

Agglutinative languages
Northeast Caucasian languages
Languages of Russia